Žuželo  is a village in the municipalities of Novo Goražde, Republika Srpska and Goražde, Bosnia and Herzegovina.

Demographics 
According to the 2013 census, its population was 40, all Bosniaks, with 3 of them living in the Goražde part and 37 in the Novo Goražde part.

References

Populated places in Novo Goražde
Populated places in Goražde